True Love is an album by Toots & the Maytals. It is a collection of their classics re-recorded with guest artists including Willie Nelson, Eric Clapton, Jeff Beck, Trey Anastasio, No Doubt, Ben Harper, Bonnie Raitt, Manu Chao, The Roots, Ryan Adams, Keith Richards, and The Skatalites. The album was produced and conceived by Richard Feldman and released on the V2 label.

True Love won the 2005 Grammy Award for Best Reggae Album.

Critical reception 
Revisiting the album after Toots Hibbert's death in 2020, Robert Christgau appraised the opening songs as "glorious" and said that overall, "with Hibbert's slightly less muscular timbre as roughly soulful as ever", these remakes "constitute as fine an album as he ever made".

Track listing
All tracks credited to Toots Hibbert, unless otherwise noted.

Personnel
Toots and the Maytals:
Andrew Bassford
Radcliffe Bryan
Paul Douglas
Charles Farquharson
Carl Harvey
Frederick "Toots" Hibbert
Clifton Jackie Jackson
Norris Webb
Stephen Stewart
Leba Thomas
TooTs is Frederick Hibbert

Senior Executive Producer; MIKE CACIA 30+years (Deceased 2016)

Production
Engineers/mixers: Richard Feldman, Rudolph Valentino, Tom Weir, Ted Paduck Executive Senior Producer Mike Cacia,
Producer: Richard Feldman

Awards

|-
| 2004
| True Love
| Best Reggae Album
| Grammy
| 
|
|

References

Toots and the Maytals albums
2004 albums
V2 Records albums
Grammy Award for Best Reggae Album